Leo Aryeh Mayer (12 January 1895 – 6 April 1959), was an Israeli scholar of Islamic art and rector of the Hebrew University of Jerusalem.

Biography
Mayer was born in 1895, in the city of Stanisławów, Galicia, then in Austria-Hungary (now renamed Ivano-Frankivsk in Ukraine), to an eminent rabbinical hasidic family. In 1913, he went to study Eastern Art at the University of Vienna, specialising in the Muslim East and its cultural history, and also studied at the University of Lausanne and the University of Berlin. He was awarded a doctorate by the University of Vienna in 1917 for an unpublished thesis on town planning in Islam. While in Vienna, he also trained in the Jewish Theological Seminary in Vienna, and began to operate within the Zionist "Hashomer" movement (later to become the Hashomer Hatzair).

In 1917, Mayer finished his studies and began teaching and working as an assistant librarian at the Institute of Oriental. In 1919, he returned to his hometown and started teaching in high school. However, due to the turmoil that followed the First World War (Stanisławów was fought over, and occupied at different time, by the forces of Poland, the West Ukrainian National Republic, Romania, the Ukrainian separatist forces and the Red Army, before it was finally incorporated into Poland until 1939), Meyer moved to Berlin and was employed in the oriental department of city's state library.

Mayer emigrated to Mandate Palestine in 1921 and began working the Department of Antiquities of the government of the British Mandate, as an inspector until 1929, and from 1929 to 1933 as Director of the Archives. After leaving the department, he was given the honorary appointment as a supervisor at the new Government museum in Jerusalem.
 
In the meantime, in 1925, Meyer had joined the first staff of the Institute of Jewish Studies of the Hebrew University of Jerusalem, and was appointed Lecturer in Islamic Art and Archaeology in 1929. In 1932, he was promoted to full professor, becoming the first Sir David Sassoon Professor of Near Eastern Art and Archaeology and served as Dean of the Faculty of Arts and as Rector of the university from 1943 to 1945.

Mayer also worked jointly with Eleazar Sukenik, in connection with the excavations of the "Third Wall" of Jerusalem, built by Agrippa, king of Judea, in 41–44 CE.

From 1940 to 1950, Mayer served as president of the Israel Exploration Society and was honorary president of the Israel Oriental Society. He was also elected a member of government Archaeological Council, a member of the Land of Israel Folklore Society, a member of Association of Archaeologists in London and an honorary member of American Heraldry Society.

Awards and honours 
 In 1948, Mayer was made an honorary Officer of the Order of the British Empire (OBE) by King George VI.
 In 1958, he was awarded the Israel Prize, in the humanities.
 The L. A. Mayer Institute for Islamic Art in Jerusalem, established in 1974, was founded in his memory.

Published books (partial)
 Excavations at the Third Wall of Jerusalem's Old City, 1930 (jointly with A.L. Sukenik)
  
 Beginning and rise of Islamic Archeology, 1935
 Annual bibliography of Islamic art and archaeology :India excepted, 1935
 
 
 new Material for Mamaluk Heraldry, Jerusalem, 1937
 articles in Ars Islamica, 1936-7
 Bibliography of Islamic numismatics, Royal Asiatic Society, 1939, 1954
 Mamaluk costume, 1952
 Religious buildings of the Muslims in Israel, 1950 (jointly with Jacob Pinkerfeld and Yigael Yadin)
 L'art juif en terre de l'Islam, 1959
 Bibliography of Jewish Art
 Islamic Architects and their works, 1956
 Islamic Astrolabists and their works, 1956
 Islamic Metalworkers and their works, 1959
 Islamic Armourers and their works, 1962

Published articles (partial list)

See also
List of Israel Prize recipients
L. A. Mayer Institute for Islamic Art

References

External links

1895 births
1959 deaths
Jews from Galicia (Eastern Europe)
Jews in Mandatory Palestine
Israeli Jews
Polish emigrants to Mandatory Palestine
University of Vienna alumni
Humboldt University of Berlin alumni
University of Lausanne alumni
Academic staff of the Hebrew University of Jerusalem
Israel Prize in humanities recipients
Members of the Order of the British Empire
Historians of the Middle East
Jewish historians
Israeli art historians
Israeli orientalists
Historians of Islamic art
People from Ivano-Frankivsk